Anthony Johnson (born 12 August 1964) is a Barbadian cricketer. He played in six first-class and six List A matches for the Barbados cricket team from 1987 to 1990.

See also
 List of Barbadian representative cricketers

References

External links
 

1964 births
Living people
Barbadian cricketers
Barbados cricketers
People from Saint James, Barbados